Broad Sound is a large bay on the east coast of Australia, in the state of Queensland,  northwest of the state capital, Brisbane. The Torilla Peninsula forms the eastern side of the bay; Shoalwater Bay is on the other side of the peninsula. This is the largest variance on the eastern Australia coastline.

History
British explorer James Cook, in HMS Endeavour, sighted the bay in May 1770, naming it for its size.  The next European navigator in the area was Matthew Flinders in HMS Investigator in 1802.

The town of St Lawrence was established midway between Rockhampton and Mackay on St Lawrence Creek and developed as a port for the export of cattle from the hinterland, with a large meatworks built close by in 1893. The processing and export of meat and cattle continued until 1919 when rail links were built elsewhere, making the port redundant.  By 2006 the population of St Lawrence had dropped to 125, out of a population in the Broad Sound area of 268.

Description
Broad Sound is 50 kilometres in length and 20 kilometres wide. The bay has a low-lying coastline with wide mudflats exposed at low tide and backed by extensive areas of mangroves. The coastline is punctuated by the mangrove-lined estuaries of several rivers and creeks, including Herbert and St Lawrence Creeks and the Styx River. Behind the mangroves is a hinterland of low, rounded hills covered by a mix of grassland and low eucalypt woodland or forest. The climate is subtropical with a dry winter.

Parts of the sound and adjoining estuarine systems are in a Declared Fish Habitat Area, the states largest such area.

Birds
It supports globally important populations of the straw-necked ibis (with up to 15,000 individual birds), Australian bustard, Latham's snipe, sharp-tailed sandpiper and mangrove honeyeater.

See also

Broad Sound Islands
Broad Sound Islands National Park
List of sounds

References

Notes

Sources
 
 

Central Queensland
Bays of Queensland
Important Bird Areas of Queensland
Sounds of Australia